Paddle Pop Adventures is a Thai animated television series computer animation with its first release in 2005. The animations were created by The Monk Studios owned by the English company Unilever - aside from one made by Egg Story Studio in 2013.
The series is based on the mascot of the Australian ice cream brand Paddle Pop lion. It was released as a film to promote the brand worldwide, but eventually became a series.

It was launched in more than 33 countries including Indonesia, Spain, France, India, Italy, Portugal and Brazil. In Australia, the series was called "Paddle Pop Adventures", where each season has been condensed into a single movie.

Synopsis 
The story follows the adventures of Max, or Paddle Pop, a young lion heir to the throne of the Lion Kingdom. He lost his parents to the antagonist Shadow Master, who had attempted to steal the Lion Crystals and achieve supreme power. However Max is saved by his tutor Professor Higganbotton. Together, he and his friends Higganbottom, Leena, Twitch, Spike, Kara and others attempt to collect the crystals themselves and stop the Shadow Master.

Movies  
The main set of movies are animated in 3D.
 Galaktika (2005) - 102 minutes long.
 Cyberion (2007) - 30 minutes long. 
 Pyrata (2008) - 45 minutes long.
 Kombatei (2009) - Originally released as 13 eight-minute episodes. 92 minutes long.
 Elemagika (2010) - Originally released as 13 eight-minute episodes. 92 minutes long. 
 Begins (2011) - Originally released as 11 twenty-minute episodes tied with Begins 2. These episodes were later split in half to make two full movies. Episode 1 was released in April 2011. Begins (2011) is 108 minutes long.
 Begins 2 (2012) 
 Dinoterra (2013) - 103 minutes long.
 Magilika (2014) - 86 minutes long.
 Magilika 2 (2014)
 Atlantos (2015) - 90 minutes long.
 Atlantos 2 (2016) - Originally released as 11 twenty-four minute episodes. 85 minutes long.

Spin-offs
 Magilika (2006) - 2D animated. ~36 minutes long.
 The New Adventure of Paddle Pop/Max The New Adventure (2017) - A TV show set in high school.

Video Games 
 Pyrata - An ARG based on the movie. Was handed out to people purchasing a Paddle Pop ice cream confectionery product at the time.
 Rise of the Lions - A level-based mobile game.
 Max Dash - A swiping mobile game.

Characters 
 Max/Paddle Pop - The lion protagonist of the series. Max is the prince (later king) of the Lion Kingdom, being the son of King Adisa and Queen Shifa, and the only survivor of the family having been rescued by Professor Higgabottom as a baby during the attacks of the Shadow Master and being taken to a forest. Early in the series he's on a journey to collect the Lion Crystals along the Leena, Professor Higgabottom, Twitch, Spike and Kara to defeat and deter the Shadow Master.
 Leena/Liona - A young lioness pilot of the Phoenix Ship. Like Max she is also an orphan, having lost her father Lionel as a child by the army of the Shadow Master and being cared for by Professor Higgabottom in a hidden underground city. She helps Max on his journey in search of the Lion Crystals, carrying him and his friends in her ship.
 Professor Higgabottom - A wise old owl longtime friend of the parents of Max. He was responsible for saving Max from Shadow Master and hide in a forest, besides taking care of Leena after the loss of his father. It is he who sends Max on his journey in search of Lion Crystals to stop the Shadow Master.
 Twitch and Spike - The goofy best friends of Max. Twitch is a blue chameleon and a wily troublemaker who is always seen with Spike, and seems to like Leena. Spike is a large and mindless porcupine who is preoccupied with eating and is very slow.
 Kara - An elephant assistant from the Lion Kingdom. He joined the team shortly after Max gets the first crystal to serve him in the journey since then.
 Shadow Master - The main villain of the series. A creature dark with a hidden face somehow seeking to take over the world always with the help of his army of dark monsters. He was responsible for mastering the Lion Kingdom during the first season as well as defeating the father of Max.

References

External links
 Official website

Thai animated television series
Computer-animated television series
Animated television series about lions
2010s animated television series